Swallow Falls State Park is a public recreation area located on the west bank of the Youghiogheny River  northwest of Oakland in Garrett County, Maryland, in the United States. The state park features Maryland's highest free-falling waterfall, the  Muddy Creek Falls, as well as smaller waterfalls on the Youghiogheny River and Tolivar Creek. The park is notable for its stand of old hemlock trees, some more than 300 years old, "the last stand of its kind in Maryland."

History
The land now known as Garrett State Forest included the areas that became Swallow Falls and Herrington Manor state parks, both of which were developed in the 1930s by the Civilian Conservation Corps. Notable persons who have visited the area include Thomas Edison, Henry Ford, John Burroughs, and Harvey Firestone, who camped at Muddy Creek Falls in the summers of 1918 and 1921.

Activities and amenities
The park contains 65 campsites, a picnic area with a pavilion and playground, as well as a mile-long hiking trail through the old growth forest. A  trail for hiking and mountain biking connects the state park with Herrington Manor State Park.

References

External links

Swallow Falls State Park Maryland Department of Natural Resources

State parks of Maryland
State parks of the Appalachians
Parks in Garrett County, Maryland
Civilian Conservation Corps in Maryland
IUCN Category III